Markham is an American crime drama series starring Ray Milland, which aired on CBS from May 2, 1959 until September 15, 1960 during the 1958–1959 and 1959–1960 seasons following Gunsmoke on Saturday nights (later appearing on Thursday nights at 9:30 P.M. Eastern, after January 1960), under the sponsorship of the Joseph Schlitz Brewing Company. At the beginning of the second season, Liggett & Myers became an alternate sponsor, succeeded by Renault when the series moved to Thursdays.

Plot
Milland played private investigator and attorney Roy Markham (previously introduced in a June 1958 Suspicion episode, "Eye For An Eye"). In that Markham had been a successful lawyer, he had the leisure to take detective cases based on his own interest. His fees could vary from the very considerable for his wealthier and corporate clients, to nothing for those who desperately needed his services but had few financial means. Markham's cases could take him almost anywhere in the world, although he was based in New York City.  

In the early episodes of this program, Markham had an assistant, John Riggs (Simon Scott), but the Riggs character was written out after only a few programs had aired, leaving Markham to solve crimes solo.

Guest stars

Dayton Lummis appeared as Howard Fulton in the 1959 episode titled "The Father". Elen Willard made her acting debut as Deidre Waugh in the 1960 segment "The Bad Spell". Rodolfo Hoyos, Jr., played Chief Gomez in the 1959 episode "The Bay of the Dead". Carole Mathews appeared as Jan Van Pelt in another 1959 episode, "The Glass Diamond".

Episodes

Season 1 (1959)

Season 2 (1959–60)

References
 Brooks, Tim and Marsh, Earle, The Complete Directory to Prime Time Network and Cable TV Shows

External links
 

1950s American crime drama television series
1960s American crime drama television series
1959 American television series debuts
1960 American television series endings
American detective television series
Black-and-white American television shows
CBS original programming
Television series by Universal Television
Television shows set in New York City